A diya, diyo, deya, deeya, dia, divaa, deepa, deepam, deep, deepak or saaki is an oil lamp made from clay or mud with a cotton wick dipped in oil or ghee. These lamps are commonly used in the Indian subcontinent and they hold sacred prominence in Hindu, Sikh, Buddhist, and Jain prayers as well as religious rituals, ceremonies and festivals including Diwali.

Traditional use
Clay diyas are symbolically lit during prayers, rituals, and ceremonies; they are permanent fixtures in homes and temples. The warm, bright glow emitted from a diya is considered auspicious, regarded to represent enlightenment, prosperity, knowledge and wisdom. Diyas represent the triumph of light over dark, good over evil with the most notable example of this being on the day of Diwali. Diwali is celebrated every year to celebrate the triumph of good over evil as told in the Hindu epic, the Ramayana. Diwali marks the day Rama, Sita, and Lakshmana returned home to Ayodhya after 14 years in exile, after the defeat of Ravana. According to tradition, to welcome Rama, Sita, and Lakshmana home, the citizens of Ayodhya are said to have lit up the streets with diyas. They are regarded to be associated with Lakshmi in Hindu iconography and worship. 

Traditionally, diyas are lit every morning within Hindu temples.

Festivals
Diwali: The lighting of diyas forms a part of celebrations and rituals of the important day in the Hindu calendar. Houses are decorated with small diyas placed at boundaries and entrances. In fact, the name of Diwali is derived from the Sanskrit word Deepavali, which means the row of lights ("deep" means Diya and "avali" means row).
Karthikai Deepam: Diyas, also known as deepam in Tamil Nadu, can be lit, especially during the Kartikai Deepam.

Worship and prayers
Lit diyas that are placed before deities during prayer in temples and then used to bless worshippers is referred to as an arati.

A similar lamp called a butter lamp is used in Tibetan Buddhist offerings as well.

Hindu rituals
Birth: The lighting of diya is also part of the Hindu religion rituals related to birth.

Types

In terms of the choice of material, the kiln fired earthenware lamps followed by the metallic lamps with multiple wicks, mostly of brass known as Samai, are the most common, though other materials are also used such as patravali floating lamp made from leaves or permanent lamps made of stones.

In terms of wick design, diyas with one wick are most common, followed by the two wick style, but other variations such as four, five or seven wick lamps are also made. 

In terms of overall lamps design, the ornamental lamps come in various designs. The iconic Nachiarkoil lamp, also known as "Annam lamp", is produced exclusively in by the Pather (Kammalar) community in Nachiyar Koil of Tamil Nadu.

See also
 Other lamps
 Butter lamp
Navratra Akhand Jyoti
 Nachiarkoil lamp
 Nilavilakku lamp
 Sky lantern
 Types of Indian oil lamps
 Related topics
 Aarti
 Diwali
 Rangoli
 List of light sources

References

Oil lamp
Indian pottery
Objects used in Hindu worship
Fire in Hindu worship
Puja (Hinduism)